is a Japanese surname. The characters for the name Watabe can also be read as Watanabe, another surname. Notable people with the surname include:

, Japanese skier
, Japanese football player
, Japanese comedian and television presenter
, born Minoru Watabe, Japanese enka singer
, Japanese voice actress
, Japanese artist living in Mexico
, Japanese voice actor
, Japanese freestyle skier

Japanese-language surnames